Procapperia linariae is a moth of the family Pterophoridae. It is found in Morocco, Spain, Asia Minor, the Balkan Peninsula, Ukraine and Kazakhstan.

Adults are on wing from June to July. There are probably two generations per year.

The larvae feed on Scutellaria demnatensis.

References

Moths described in 1922
Oxyptilini
Moths of Europe
Moths of Asia
Moths of Africa